FreightCorp, formally Freight Rail, was a railway operator owned by the Government of New South Wales responsible for intrastate and some interstate rail cargo handling from its foundation in January 1989 until it was privatised in August 2002.

History

On 1 July 1996, Freight Rail was corporatised. On 24 October 1996, Freight Rail was relaunched as FreightCorp.

On 1 February 2002, along with National Rail, FreightCorp was sold to a joint venture between Patrick Corporation and Toll Holdings as Pacific National.

Operations
When established in 1989, Freight Rail was responsible for the operation of all rail freight services in New South Wales. It was also responsible for providing locomotives to haul passenger services for CityRail and CountryLink. Following the opening up of the New South Wales network to other operators, it began to face competition from other operators. Interstate services were transferred to National Rail in the mid-1990s. In 1999, it began to operate coal trains in South Australia on the Leigh Creek to Stirling North line to the Northern Power Station, Port Augusta.

Fleet
Freight Rail inherited all of the State Rail Authority's locomotive fleet. In February 1992, it awarded contracts for fifty-eight 82 class and twenty-nine 90 class locomotives. These allowed it to withdraw most of the 422, 44, 442, 45 and 49 class locomotives. After experimenting with a green and yellow livery, a dark blue, yellow and white livery was introduced in 1991.

References

Defunct railway companies of Australia
Freight railway companies of Australia
Railway companies established in 1989
Railway companies disestablished in 2002
1989 establishments in Australia
2002 disestablishments in Australia